Radlin  is a town in Wodzisław County, Silesian Voivodeship, Poland, with 17,776 inhabitants (2019). Located in southern part of the Voivodeship, close to the Czech border, between 1975 and 1997, Radlin was a district of the city of Wodzisław Śląski.

History
First mention of the settlement of Biertułtowy (which now makes the center of Radlin) comes from 1305, as Bertholdi villa. The very name Radlin probably comes from the Polish word radło, which means ard. In the 19th century, Radlin was one of the biggest villages of the Rybnik County of the Kingdom of Prussia. Like other locations of Upper Silesia, it grew in the 19th century, when several enterprises were opened there – Coal Mine Marcel, Coke Plant Radlin. In 1922, after Silesian Uprisings, it became part of Poland.

Sport
Górnik Radlin – men's volleyball team playing in Polish Volleyball League
KS Górnik Radlin – men's football team
KG Radlin – gymnastic club, founded in 1920, where trained 20 Polish Olympic athletes

Sights
 Graduation Tower in Radlin – first graduation tower on an industrial side of Upper Silesia  in Poland 
Kolonia Emma in Radlin – modernist estate of the nineteenth century designed as a "garden city"

Notable people
Bolesław Kominek (1903–1974), Cardinal of the Roman Catholic Church
Leszek Blanik (born 1977), gymnast, World and Olympic champion

Twin towns – sister cities

Radlin is twinned with:
 Genthin, Germany
 Mohelnice, Czech Republic
 Rohatyn, Ukraine

References

External links

Cities and towns in Silesian Voivodeship
Wodzisław County